Tubon (also Romanized as Tūbon) is a village in Sakht Sar Rural District, in the Central District of Ramsar County, Mazandaran Province, Iran. At the 2006 census, its population was 457, in 125 families.

References 

Populated places in Ramsar County